Tanasijević is a Serbo-Croatian surname. Notable people with the surname include:

Dan Tana (born 1933), American restaurateur and former Yugoslavian footballer
Dragan Tanasijević (born 1959), Serbian photographer 
Jovan Tanasijević (born 1978), former Montenegrin footballer
Strahinja Tanasijević (born 1997), Serbian footballer

Serbian surnames
Slavic-language surnames
Patronymic surnames